See Fortified Sector of Haguenau for a broader discussion of the Haguenau sector of the Maginot Line.
Casemate d'Auenheim Nord is an infantry casemate of the Maginot Line located in the town of Auenheim, in Alsace.

Description 

The casemate is a simple flanking  one built in 1932 to take in an officer, a non-commissioned officer and 20 troops.

Organisation 

Entrance with an armoured door, shooting room, a room for filters, a room for the electric power supply, 2 restrooms and a latrine.

Armament 

 37 mm antitank gun
 3 twinings of machine-gun of 7.5 mm
 5 rifle machine-guns
 2 50 mm mortars
 grenade launchers

Notes and references 

 The Maginot Line website

AUEN